Delabere Pritchett Blaine (1768–1845) was an English veterinary surgeon and Professor of Animal Medicine.

Biography
Blaine at one stage ran a veterinary infirmary in Wells Street, Oxford Street, London. From about 1812 he was in partnership there with William Youatt, for around 12 years; then Youatt took over the business.

He may have been a contributor to Rees's Cyclopædia. He is not in the Philosophical Magazine list, but in the Prospectus as writing on Veterinary Art and Sporting Life.

Publications
Anatomy of the Horse, 1799
Canine Pathology, 1800
The Outlines of Veterinary Art, 1802
A Domestic Treatise on the diseases of Horses and Dogs, 1803
Encyclopaedia of Rural Sports, 1840, second edition 1852 edited by Charles Bindley and others

References

 – Simonds, A bibliographical Sketch of Two Distinguished Promoters of Veterinary Science, Delabere P. Blaine and William Youatt, London, 1896
J. W. Barber-Lomax, 'Delabere Pritchett Blaine: A Biographical Note', Journal of Small Animal Practice Volume 2, Issue 1-4, pages 135–136, February 1961
Fussell, G. E., 'Delabere Pritchett Blaine 1770-1845',. Veterinary History, N.S., 2001 11 (2), 83-87

External links
WorldCat page

1768 births
1845 deaths
English veterinarians